Alberto Abengózar Martínez (born 5 July 1989 in Alcázar de San Juan, Province of Ciudad Real, Castile-La Mancha) is a Spanish footballer who plays as a striker.

External links
Villarrobledo official profile 

1989 births
Living people
Sportspeople from the Province of Ciudad Real
Spanish footballers
Footballers from Castilla–La Mancha
Association football forwards
Segunda División players
Segunda División B players
Tercera División players
CF Gimnástico Alcázar players
Getafe CF B players
Atlético Albacete players
Albacete Balompié players
La Roda CF players
Ontinyent CF players
CD Olímpic de Xàtiva footballers
Internacional de Madrid players